Body piercing jewelry is jewelry manufactured specifically for use in body piercing. The jewelry involved in the art of body piercing comes in a wide variety of shapes and sizes in order to best fit the pierced site. Jewelry may be worn for fashion, cultural tradition, religious beliefs, personal symbolism, and many other reasons.

History 
Originally, hardly any other jewelry than circular earrings were used in modern Western body piercing. As the body piercing became more of a fashion, a vast amount of specially crafted jewelry became available to the public. Common types of body jewelry that are sold often in modern days include barbells, captive bead rings, labrets, navel curves, plugs, spirals, and various other types of piercing jewelry. Materials used for production have grown from traditional gold and silver to widespread use of surgical steel as well as titanium, niobium, glass, and several kinds of plastics (PTFE, Tygon, bioplast, nylon). Wood, horn, amber, stone, bamboo, silicone, fossilized ivories, tusks, bones, and porcelain can also be used to craft body piercing jewelry.

Gallery

See also 
Body piercing materials
Body piercing jewelry sizes
Barbell
Captive bead ring
Claw
Prince's wand
Spike
Spiral
Stud
Flesh tunnel

External links

 Association of Professional Piercers